Martinez is a census-designated place (CDP) in Columbia County, Georgia, United States. It is a northwestern suburb of Augusta and is part of the Augusta, Georgia metropolitan area. The population was 34,535 at the 2020 census.

Geography
Martinez is located in eastern Columbia County at  (33.516089, -82.100024). It is bordered to the southeast by the city of Augusta in Richmond County. To the north and northwest is the CDP of Evans. Interstate 20 forms the short southern boundary of Martinez, with access from Exits 194 (Georgia State Route 383/South Belair Road) and 195 (Wheeler Road).

The areas of the CDP closest to the Richmond County line tend to be relatively flat, while land further west is hillier. Trees in Martinez are seen mainly in the subdivisions, as the main roads are crowded with businesses. They include pine, oak, sweet gum, hickory, and a variety of other species.

History
The founder was José Martínez y Saldivar, a wealthy man from Cuba. He bought a plantation in Columbia County in 1869 and named it El Cordero Rancho ("The Lamb Ranch"). He wanted to be an American soldier. He ended up having four daughters who married very wealthy men, one being a Dr. Perrin who died around 1940. El Cordero Ranch is now only  in size. His old home (hacienda) and several buildings, barns and a water tower original to the property still stand at 3654 
Old Ferry Road.

Demographics

2020 census

As of the 2020 United States census, there were 34,535 people, 11,780 households, and 8,153 families residing in the CDP.

2000 census
As of the census of 2000, there were 27,749 people, 9,886 households, and 8,037 families residing in the CDP.  The population density was 2,207.1 people per square mile (852.3/km).  There were 10,320 housing units at an average density of 820.8 per square mile (317.0/km).  The racial makeup of the CDP was 83.98% White, 8.02% African American, 0.23% Native American, 5.60% Asian, 0.07% Pacific Islander, 0.68% from other races, and 1.42% from two or more races. Hispanic or Latino of any race were 2.31% of the population.

There were 9,886 households, out of which 44.9% had children under the age of 18 living with them, 67.2% were married couples living together, 11.2% had a female householder with no husband present, and 18.7% were non-families. 15.6% of all households were made up of individuals, and 4.4% had someone living alone who was 65 years of age or older.  The average household size was 2.80 and the average family size was 3.13.

In the CDP, the population was spread out, with 29.3% under the age of 18, 7.2% from 18 to 24, 30.9% from 25 to 44, 25.4% from 45 to 64, and 7.1% who were 65 years of age or older.  The median age was 35 years. For every 100 females, there were 95.4 males.  For every 100 females age 18 and over, there were 91.2 males.

The median income for a household in the CDP was $68,300, and the median income for a family was $80,390. Males had a median income of $47,312 versus $30,821 for females. The per capita income for the CDP was $29,345.  About 2.5% of families and 3.1% of the population were below the poverty line, including 3.5% of those under age 18 and 5.4% of those age 65 or over.

Highways

Schools
Augusta Preparatory Day School
 Lakeside High School
 Evans High School
 Greenbrier High School
Augusta Christian Schools
Adventist Christian School
 Lakeside Middle School
 Riverside Middle School
 Columbia Middle School
 Greenbrier Middle School
 Evans Middle School
 Stallings Island Middle School
 Martinez Elementary School
 Blue Ridge Elementary School
 Westmont Elementary School
 South Columbia Elementary School
 Stevens Creek Elementary School

See also

Central Savannah River Area

References

Census-designated places in Columbia County, Georgia
Census-designated places in Georgia (U.S. state)
Augusta metropolitan area